Steel blue is a shade of blue color that resembles blue steel, i.e., steel which has been subjected to bluing for protection from rust. It is one of the less vibrant shades of blue, and is usually identified as a blue-grey color.

The first recorded use of steel blue as a color name in English was in 1817.

In 1987, Steel blue was included as one of the X11 colors, later also known as the X11 web colors after the invention of the World Wide Web in 1991.

Variations of steel blue

Light steel blue

At right is displayed the web color light steel blue, a light tint of steel blue.

Steel blue in nature

Beetles
 The Steel blue lady beetle

Fish
 In Siamese fighting fish the steel blue color comes from being homozygous for a single gene.
 The Steel-blue Aphyosemion

Birds
 Steel-blue whydah
 Steel-blue flycatcher

Steel blue in culture
Sports
 The Houston Texans, National Football League team includes deep steel blue as one of its three colors (along with "liberty white" and "battle red").
 The Lehigh Valley IronPigs, the AAA affiliate of the Philadelphia Phillies baseball team, includes steel blue as one of its three colors.
 The Colorado Avalanche of the National Hockey League use steel blue as a secondary color on their burgundy uniforms.
 The Steel Blue Oval is a sports stadium in Bassendean, Western Australia.

See also
 RAL 5011 Steel blue
 List of colors

References

Shades of azure
Shades of blue